Filimon "Fil" Delacruz (born 1950) is a National artist nominee, visual artist and a master printmaker who specializes in mezzotint prints, a printmaking process used to achieve producing half tones without the use of line or dot based techniques such as hatching, stippling and pointillism. His works is known for being rich in ethnic imageries and indigenous symbols. He is a former president of the Philippine Association of the Printmakers and a former senior lecturer of college of fine arts in University of the Philippines Diliman.

Early life and education

Delacruz was born on November 22, 1950, in Hagonoy, Bulacan. He is the father of Janos Delacruz, an award-winning printmaker. He studied in University of Santo Tomas College of Architecture and Fine Arts and pursued Advertising major. He went to New York to be part of Art Students' League in 1983 and in 1992, he attended a lithography workshop in Paris, France to study printmaking techniques and at the same time, he was named by the Cultural Center of the Philippines (CCP) as one of the Thirteen Artist Awardees, a triennial and prestigious award granted by the Cultural Center of the Philippines. During his early years, he is fond of participating national competitions, which he wins consistently especially in the annual art competition by the Art Association of the Philippines (AAP). He is an awardee of Benavidez Award for Outstanding Achievement.

Career history

From 1992 to 1995, Delacruz worked as a senior lecturer at the University of the Philippines College of Fine Arts in Diliman, Quezon City. After years of teaching, he was appointed as the president of the Philippine Association of Printmakers in 1995. He is also a president of Lakansining ng Bulakan. His works has been exhibited in France, New York, New Jersey, Czechoslovakia, Germany, China, Hong Kong, Korea, Spain, Belgium, and in the Philippines. He is currently residing in his studio named "Bahay Sining", which is located in Muntinlupa together with his son, Janos. Delacruz is holding art workshops in the Artist Gallery BF located in Paranaque.

Awards, distinctions and achievements

See also
 Janos Delacruz
 Printmaking
 Mezzotint
 Art Students League of New York

References

External links 
 http://fildelacruz.tripod.com
 http://www.190gallery.com/artists.php?profile=29 
 https://web.archive.org/web/20150518100901/http://art.spongemode.com/interview-with-fil-delacruz/
 https://filipinojourneys.wordpress.com/2013/08/13/fil-de-la-cruz/

1950 births
Artists from Bulacan
Living people
Filipino artists
University of Santo Tomas alumni
Filipino printmakers